The Loupin Stanes is a stone circle near Eskdalemuir, Dumfries and Galloway. Oval in shape, it consists of twelve stones set on an artificial platform. At the WSW of the circle are two large pillars, which are typical of the 'entrance circles' of south-west Scotland. The circle takes its name from the tradition of leaping between the tops of these two stones.

There were two other circles nearby, which are now ruined and almost imperceptible. A line of stones leads south to the Girdle Stanes; it is possible that this is the remains of an avenue linking the two circles.

See also 
Stone circles in the British Isles and Brittany
List of stone circles

References

Stone circles in Dumfries and Galloway
Scheduled monuments in Scotland